Reasonable Doubts is an American police drama television series created by Robert Singer, which broadcast in the United States by NBC that ran from September 26, 1991 to April 27, 1993.

Synopsis 
Reasonable Doubts is primarily about the working relationship between Assistant District Attorney Tess Kaufman (Marlee Matlin), a prosecutor very sensitive to the rights of the accused, and hard-charging, gruff Detective Dicky Cobb (Mark Harmon), an old-fashioned cop with a "bust-the-perps" attitude. The reason that these two are assigned to work together was that Cobb is one of the few available police officers who knows sign language, and Tess, like the actress who portrayed her, is deaf. Dicky is usually more frustrated by Tess' sympathy for the suspects than by her deafness; he also repeats what Tess says back to her to make sure that he understood it (Tess can also read lips) and this allowed the audience to understand her part of the dialogue. Dicky also spoke as he signed to Tess.

Both characters are romantically involved with other people when the series opens: Tess is estranged from, but still in contact with, her husband Bruce (Tim Grimm); Dicky had a manipulative girlfriend named Kay Lockman (Nancy Everhard), who is, unsurprisingly, quite jealous of Tess, and not without reason, as a considerable mutual attraction, despite their differences, has developed between Tess and Dicky. The situation becomes more complicated with the death of Kay early in the second season, freeing the characters to pursue the relationship at least somewhat, although its resolution is still up in the air when the program was not renewed for a third season. Cobb was also involved with flinty lawyer Maggie Zombro (Kay Lenz), an early continuing character who became a regular in later seasons.

Executive producer Bob Singer gained some interest from the network in spinning off the show into a straight cop drama starring Harmon and Jim Beaver, who had played Dicky's friend and partner Detective Earl Gaddis from the beginning of the show, but ultimately NBC demurred.

Cast 
 Mark Harmon as Detective Dickie Cobb
 Marlee Matlin as Assistant District Attorney Tess Kaufman
 William Converse-Roberts as District Attorney Arthur Gold
 Nancy Everhard as Kay Lockman
 Tim Grimm as Bruce Kaufman
 Kay Lenz as Maggie Zombro (recurring, season 1; main, season 2)

Episodes

Season 1 (1991–92)

Season 2 (1992–93)

Awards and nominations

References

 Brooks, Tim and Marsh, Earle, The Complete Directory to Prime Time Network and Cable TV Shows

External links

NBC original programming
1990s American legal television series
1990s American crime drama television series
Deaf culture in the United States
Sign language television shows
English-language television shows
Television series by Lorimar Television
1991 American television series debuts
1993 American television series endings
Fictional portrayals of the Chicago Police Department
Television shows about deaf people
Television series about prosecutors